Menelaos Efstathiou (born 2 March 1999) is a Cypriot tennis player.

Efstathiou has a career high ATP singles ranking of No. 964 achieved on 15 August 2022. He also has a career high ATP doubles ranking of No. 1138 achieved on 15 August 2022.

Efstathiou has represented Cyprus in the Davis Cup, where he has a W/L record of 5–6.

Juniors
Efstathiou reached the quarterfinals of the 2017 Australian Open boys' singles championships.

Efstathiou has a career high ITF junior combined ranking of world No. 42 achieved on 27 March 2017.

Personal life
Efstathiou's manager is Socrates Polycarpou and his best friend is Philippos Neocleous.

Davis Cup

Participations: (5–6)

   indicates the outcome of the Davis Cup match followed by the score, date, place of event, the zonal classification and its phase, and the court surface.

Games of the Small States of Europe

Doubles 2 (2 victory)

References

External links

1999 births
Living people
Cypriot male tennis players
Wake Forest Demon Deacons men's tennis players
Competitors at the 2018 Mediterranean Games
Mediterranean Games competitors for Cyprus